Alia Bushnaq (born December 19, 2000), is a Jordanian national athlete, practicing in short-distance events. She started in 2012 and joined the Jordanian national team in 2015. She qualified in 2021 for the Olympic Games (Tokyo 2020).
Bushnaq is considered the first Jordanian player to qualify for the World Championships for juniors and girls in 2017, and she was crowned with two gold medals in the 200 and 400 meters races in the Arab Women’s Championship.

References 

Olympic competitors for Jordan
Sportspeople from Amman
Living people
2000 births